A biblical name, Baal-meon, meaning Lord of Dwelling, was the name of a town of Reuben, that some have identified as modern-day Ma`in in Jordan.  It was allegedly the birthplace of the prophet Elisha. It appears in the stela of Mesha, king of Moab, who seized it in the 9th century.

References

Hebrew Bible cities